The 1996–97 Pittsburgh Panthers men's basketball team represented the University of Pittsburgh in the 1996–97 NCAA Division I men's basketball season. Led by head coach Ralph Willard, the Panthers finished with a record of 18–15. They were invited to the 1997 National Invitation Tournament where they lost in the second round to Arkansas.

References

Pittsburgh Panthers men's basketball seasons
Pittsburgh
Pittsburgh Pan
Pittsburgh Pan